Albert Speer (29 July 1934 – 15 September 2017) was a German architect and urban planner. He was the son of Albert Speer (1905–1981), Adolf Hitler's chief architect before assuming the office of Minister of Armaments and War Production for Germany during World War II. His grandfather, Albert Friedrich Speer, was also an architect.

Career
Speer claimed that his decision to become an architect had nothing to do with his father. He considered urban planning to be his main area, rather than architecture. He won his first international prize in 1964, and then opened his own architect's office. He also worked in Saudi Arabia. In 1977, he became professor of urban planning at the University of Kaiserslautern in the state of Rheinland-Palatinate. His firm has had an office in Shanghai since 2001.

In 1984, he founded the company Büro Albert Speer & Partner in Frankfurt am Main. He was responsible for the design of Expo 2000 in Hanover, design of the Shanghai International Automobile City, and the central axis in Beijing created while serving as lead designer for the 2008 Olympics. Speer was part of the architectural firm involved in Munich's bid for the 2018 Winter Olympics, and in the Qatar 2022 FIFA World Cup. 

He died on 15 September 2017 at the age of 83 in Frankfurt am Main, Germany, after complications with a surgery performed after falling in his home.

Relationship with his father 
As with the other children of Nazi officials, such as Gudrun Himmler and Edda Göring, Speer had to approach the topic of his father's infamy. While Himmler would attempt to rehabilitate her father's image, and Göring tried her best to avoid speaking about it at all, Speer said that he "tried his whole life to separate himself from his father". He is credited with being one of the few children of Nazi leaders to recognize the wrongs of their parent. Speer said that, as a child, his father "was not the kind of father who went over your homework", referring to inattentiveness and mild neglect, but also said that Hitler was "a nice uncle, from my childish perspective." He said he did not hate his father and considered him "a good architect, much more modern than people think today".

References

External links

 
 

1934 births
2017 deaths
20th-century German architects
Recipients of the Cross of the Order of Merit of the Federal Republic of Germany
Albert
Architects from Berlin
Deaths from falls